Cleveland Hearing & Speech Center (CHSC) is a non-profit (501(c)3) organization based in Cleveland, Ohio specializing in providing hearing services, speech-language and learning, and interpreting and advocacy services through its Community Center for the Deaf and Hard of Hearing program.

In addition to its main headquarters in the University Circle district, Cleveland Hearing & Speech also has satellite offices in South Euclid, Ohio, Broadview Heights, Ohio, and Westlake, Ohio. On average, nearly 8,000 children and adults come to the Center each year.

Healthcare in Cleveland